The 2018 Northern Arizona Lumberjacks football team represented Northern Arizona University in the 2018 NCAA Division I FCS football season. They were led by 21st-year head coach Jerome Souers and played their home games at the Walkup Skydome. They were a member of the Big Sky Conference. They finished the season 4–6, 3–4 in Big Sky play to finish in eighth place.

On November 19, Jerome Souers announced his retirement. He finished with a 21 year record of 123–114.

Previous season
The Lumberjacks finished the 2017 season 7–5, 6–2 in Big Sky play to finish in a three-way tie for third place. They received an at-large bid into the FCS Playoffs where they were lost to San Diego in the first round.

Roster

Preseason

Polls
On July 16, 2018 during the Big Sky Kickoff in Spokane, Washington, the Lumberjacks were predicted to finish in third place by both the coaches and media.

Preseason All-Conference Team
The Lumberjacks had three players selected to the Preseason All-Conference Team.

Emmanuel Butler – Sr. WR

Khalil Dorsey – Jr. CB

Wes Sutton – Sr. S

Award watch lists

Schedule

Source: Official Schedule

Despite also being a member of the Big Sky, the game vs. Eastern Washington will be a non-conference game and will have no effect on the Big Sky standings.

Game summaries

at UTEP

Eastern Washington

at Missouri State

Southern Utah

at Idaho State

Weber State

at Northern Colorado

Cal Poly

at UC Davis

North Dakota

Ranking movements

References

Northern Arizona
Northern Arizona Lumberjacks football seasons
Northern Arizona Lumberjacks football